The Fédération Française des clubs alpins et de montagne (FFCAM) is a federation of clubs promoting mountain sports. It offers multiple training programs and courses to help people understand mountains and manages 142 mountain huts, mostly in the Alps and the Pyrenees.

It has evolved and grown greatly since its creation in 1874 as the Club alpin français (CAF). It was renamed on January 30, 2005 during its 5th congress, in Chambéry. It has become a sport federation with 241 affiliated associations, bringing together some tens of thousands of people in a single group. Almost 90,000 people are licensed through it to date. Regional and departmental committees relay the actions of the federation on a local level.

It is one of the founding members of the International Climbing and Mountaineering Federation (commonly known by the French name , Union Internationale des Associations d'Alpinisme, or abbreviation, UIAA).

See also

 Swiss Alpine Club
 Alpine Club (UK)
 Pyreneism

External links

 Site officiel du Club alpin français (Official site of the Club)
 Mountain huts of the Club alpin français (Official site of the Club)
 Clubs of the Club alpin français (Official site of the Club)

Sports organizations of France
Alpine clubs